The Mickelson-Chapman Fountain is a monument and sculpture installed in front of Ashland, Oregon's Carnegie Library, in the United States.

References

External links

 Michelson-Chapman Fountain – Ashland Downtown Historic District at Waymarking

Fountains in Oregon
Monuments and memorials in Oregon
Outdoor sculptures in Ashland, Oregon
Statues in Oregon